Hemiphragma is an extinct genus of Middle Ordovician bryozoan. It had branching colonies with thick-walled zooecial apertures and lots of acanthopores, but few mesopores.

References

Middle Ordovician
Prehistoric bryozoan genera